Shonk is a surname. Notable people with the surname include:

 Gabrielle Shonk, Canadian singer-songwriter
 George Washington Shonk (1850–1900), American politician
 Herbert B. Shonk (1881–1930), American lawyer, businessman, and politician
 John Shonk (1918–1984), American football player